Lee Seog-un (born 17 March 1952) is a South Korean boxer. He competed in the men's light flyweight event at the 1972 Summer Olympics.

References

1952 births
Living people
South Korean male boxers
Olympic boxers of South Korea
Boxers at the 1972 Summer Olympics
Place of birth missing (living people)
Light-flyweight boxers